Alternative Airplay is a record chart published by the music industry magazine Billboard that ranks the most-played songs on American modern rock radio stations. Introduced in September 1988, the chart is based on airplay data compiled from a panel of national rock radio stations, with songs being ranked by their total number of spins per week. Stations on the panel are electronically monitored by Mediabase, who replaced Broadcast Data Systems in this capacity beginning with the chart dated November 12, 2022. The first number-one song of the 2020s on the chart was "Orphans" by Coldplay.

Number-one songs
Key
 – Billboard year-end number-one song
↑ – Return of a song to number one

References

External links
 Alternative Airplay at Billboard

2020s
United States alternative songs